The 2020 Dallas Fuel season was the third season of the Dallas Fuel's existence in the Overwatch League. The Fuel planned to host league-high five homestand weekends in the 2020 season at Esports Stadium Arlington, Toyota Music Factory, the Allen Event Center, and two more undetermined locations. While the first homestand at Esports Stadium Arlington took place, all other homestands were canceled due to the COVID-19 pandemic.

After a 7–10 start to the season and failure to make it past the quarterfinals in any of the three midseason tournaments, the Fuel released head coach Aaron "Aero" Atkins on August 3 and announced that assistant coach Kim Yong-jin served would as the interim head coach for the remainder of the season. Dallas finished the season with a 9–12 record, marking their third consecutive season with a losing regular season record. A 0–3 loss to the Washington Justice on September 4 in the North America play-ins tournament took the Fuel out of postseason contention.

Preceding offseason

Organizational changes 

On November 15, assistant coach Justin "Jayne" Conroy announced that he would be stepping down from his position to move to a content creation role within Envy Gaming. Weeks later, on December 5, the Fuel mutually parted ways with assistance coach Julien "daemoN" Ducros. The Fuel finalized their coaching staff heading into the 2020 season on December 9, announcing the return of head coach Aaron "Aero" Atkins, the return of Louis "Tikatee" Lebel-Wong and Kang "Vol’Jin" Min-gyu as assistant coaches, and the signing former Element Mystic assistant coach Kim "Yong" Yong-Jin as an assistant coach.

Roster changes 
Heading into the 2020 season, the Fuel's only free agent is only off-tank Lucas "NotE" Meissner, who was traded from the Boston Uprising to Dallas the previous season. Free agency officially began on October 7. NotE was re-signed to the Fuel on October 30.

The Fuel's first transaction of the offseason took place on October 29, when they traded main tank Son "OGE" Min-seok to the Los Angeles Gladiators in exchange for flex DPS Jang "Decay" Gui-un. In OGE's replacement, the team announced the signing of former Shanghai Dragons main tank Noh "Gamsu" Young-jin on November 4. A week later, the team signed Element Mystic DPS Kim "Doha" Dong-ha. On January 8, the team sent DPS Timo "Taimou" Kettunen down to their academy team Team Envy. The Fuel parted way with tank player Pongphop "Micke" Rattanasangchod just under two weeks before the beginning of the season; Micke moved to a content creator role for Envy Gaming. On February 3, Dallas announced their full roster, which included the promotion of support player William "Crimzo" Hernandez from Team Envy.

Roster

Transactions 
Transactions of/for players on the roster during the 2020 regular season:
On June 3, DPS Zachary "ZachaREEE" Lombardo retired.
On June 7, the Fuel acquired support Nolan "Paintbrush" Edwards from the Los Angeles Gladiators.
On June 19, the Fuel signed DPS Stefan "Onigod" Fiskerstrand.
On August 3, the Fuel released DPS Jang "Decay" Gui-un.
On August 5, the Fuel released support Jonathan "HarryHook" Tejedor Rua.

Standings

Game log

Regular season

Midseason tournaments 

| style="text-align:center;" | Bonus wins awarded: 0

Postseason

References 

Dallas Fuel
Dallas Fuel
Dallas Fuel seasons